Bugley is a small hamlet in the district of North Dorset, in the county of Dorset, England. The River Stour runs past the hamlet. It is close to the town of Gillingham. 

Hamlets in Dorset